K. Venkatesh (born in Kittur Periyapatna) is a former member of the Karnataka Legislative Assembly in Karnataka, a state in southern India. He is a member of the Indian National Congress.

References

Year of birth missing (living people)
Living people
Indian National Congress politicians
Karnataka MLAs 2004–2007
Indian National Congress politicians from Karnataka